The Zittau–Oybin/Jonsdorf railway, or Zittau–Kurort Oybin/Kurort Jonsdorf narrow-gauge railway (German: Schmalspurbahn Zittau–Kurort Oybin/Kurort Jonsdorf), is a narrow-gauge railway system employing steam locomotives and serving the mountain health-spa resorts (German: Kurorte) of Oybin and Jonsdorf in the Zittau Mountains in southeast Saxony (Germany).

See also 
 Narrow-gauge railways in Saxony

Literature
 Gustav W. Ledig: Linie Zittau–Reichenau–Markersdorf in Die schmalspurigen Staatseisenbahnen im Königreiche Sachsen, S. 88 ff., Leipzig 1895. Reprint: Zentralantiquariat der DDR,  Leipzig 1987, 
 Erich Preuß: Die Zittau–Oybin–Jonsdorfer Eisenbahn. transpress Verlag, Stuttgart 1999,

External links

SOEG official website of Zittau Narrow Gauge Railway including timetables
Fan site of the Zittau Narrow Gauge Railway

Railway lines in Saxony
750 mm gauge railways in Germany
Zittau
Görlitz (district)
Zittau Mountains